The 2015 Bank of Communications OTO Shanghai Masters was a professional ranking snooker tournament that took place between 14 and 20 September 2015 at the Shanghai Grand Stage in Shanghai, China. It was the second ranking event of the 2015/2016 season.

Stuart Bingham was the defending champion, but he lost 3–6 against Judd Trump in the semi-finals.

Kyren Wilson won his first ranking title, defeating Trump 10–9 in the final.

Prize fund
The breakdown of prize money from this year is shown below:

 Winner: £85,000
 Runner-up: £35,000
 Semi-final: £19,500
 Quarter-final: £12,000
 Last 16: £8,000
 Last 32: £6,000
 Last 48: £3,000
 Last 64: £2,000
 Last 96: £500

 Non-televised highest break: £200
 Televised highest break: £2,000
 Total: £465,200

Wildcard round
These matches were played in Shanghai on 14 and 15 September 2015.

Main draw

 Ricky Walden withdrew to attend the birth of his son, which took place on 14 September.
 Mark Selby withdrew as his father-in-law died shortly before the tournament began.

Final

Qualifying
These matches were held between 5 and 9 August 2015 at the Barnsley Metrodome in Barnsley, England.

Century breaks

Qualifying stage centuries

 140, 131  Cao Yupeng
 138  Zhou Yuelong
 136  Anthony Hamilton
 136  Martin O'Donnell
 134, 104  Zhang Anda
 133, 117  Tom Ford
 133, 114  Tian Pengfei
 131  Zhang Yong
 129  Mike Dunn
 128, 102  Kyren Wilson
 128  Fergal O'Brien
 128  Jimmy Robertson
 127  Liam Highfield
 126  Mark King
 121, 108, 104  Luca Brecel
 121, 101  Anthony McGill
 121  Nigel Bond
 119  Joel Walker

 119  Kurt Maflin
 118  Dominic Dale
 113  Robert Milkins
 110  Joe Swail
 110  Hossein Vafaei
 110  Alex Taubman
 109  Gerard Greene
 108, 100  Ross Muir
 108  Li Hang
 106, 104  Jamie Burnett
 106, 103  Jamie Cope
 103  Rory McLeod
 102  Liang Wenbo
 102  Matthew Stevens
 101  Paul Davison
 100  Rod Lawler
 100  Rhys Clark
 100  Lee Walker

Televised stage centuries

 140  Luca Brecel
 134  Peter Ebdon
 128, 108, 104  Mark Williams
 126  Mark Davis
 123  Kyren Wilson
 122, 115, 104, 100  Judd Trump
 122, 100  Alan McManus
 120  Mike Dunn

 118, 103  Stuart Bingham
 115, 104  Fang Xiongman
 109  Martin Gould
 107  Shaun Murphy
 104  Ding Junhui
 101  Mark Allen
 101  Michael Holt

References

External links

2015
Shanghai Masters
Shanghai Masters